Fakty i Kommentarii (translated as Facts and Comments) has been coming out since August 1997. 

Fakty was published five times a week except Sundays and Mondays till January 2018. In 2018 it has turned to weekly. 

Oleksandr Shvets is editor-in-chief and the owner. The edition was a property of EastOne Group till June 2016.

History

The newspaper began coming out in August 1997.

The long detailed headline for each article is the paper's style feature.

According to TNS Fakty i Kommentarii were second among weeklies since 2006 till 2009. In 2010 the edition become a leader of the “Common Interest Editions” segment. At that time the readership of its one issue was more than 1.300.000 persons. 

In 2009 the newspaper had to close its own distribution net because of global financial crisis.

In spring of 2015 the editorial office had to cut the third part of its staff because of the economic crisis that has been provoked by the armed conflict in the Eastern Ukraine. 

In June 2016 EastOne Group has sold Fakty i Kommentarii to general director and editor-in-chief Oleksandr Shvets. 

Since January 2018 Fakty i Kommentarii has been coming out in the form of weekly. 

Meanwhile its web-portal fakty.ua started to cover news in Ukraine and all over the world on a 24-hour basis.

External links 
Fakty i Kommentarii online

Newspapers established in 1997
Russian-language newspapers published in Ukraine
Mass media in Kyiv
Ukrainian news websites
Daily newspapers published in Ukraine
Weekly newspapers published in Ukraine